Perry L. Christensen (born August 30, 1932) was an American politician in the state of Iowa.

Christensen was born in Creston, Iowa. He was a farmer. He served in the Iowa House of Representatives from 1967 to 1973 as a Republican.

References

1932 births
Living people
People from Creston, Iowa
Farmers from Iowa
Republican Party members of the Iowa House of Representatives